Arthur Hambling (14 March 1888 – 6 December 1952) was a British actor, on stage from 1912, and best known for appearances in the films Henry V (1944) and The Lavender Hill Mob (1951). In 1939 he appeared in the West End in N.C. Hunter's comedy Grouse in June.

Selected filmography

 The W Plan (1930) - Minor Role (uncredited)
 Greek Street (1930) - Alfie
 Other People's Sins (1931) - Fireman
 Sally in Our Alley (1931) - Minor Role (uncredited)
 A Night in Montmartre (1931) - Inspector Brichot
 Detective Lloyd (1932) - Minor Role (uncredited)
 Something Always Happens (1934) - First Duped Waiter (uncredited)
 Death at Broadcasting House (1934) - Man On BBC Reception Desk (uncredited)
 The Scoop (1934) - Inspector Stephenson
 Lorna Doone (1934) - Soldier
 The Scarlet Pimpernel (1934) - Captain of the Guard (uncredited)
 Look Up and Laugh (1935) - Sam (uncredited)
 Midshipman Easy (1935) - First Lieutenant Sawbett
 Whom the Gods Love (1936) - Minor Role (uncredited)
 The House of the Spaniard (1936) - Albert Smith (uncredited)
 French Leave (1937) - Cpl. Sykes
 The Girl in the Taxi (1937) - Senior Police Officer (uncredited)
 The Last Chance (1937) - Constable Brown
 A Romance in Flanders (1937) - Colonel Kennedy
 South Riding (1938) - Village Doctor (uncredited)
 I See Ice (1938) - Prison Warder (uncredited)
 Almost a Honeymoon (1938) - Adolphus
 Kate Plus Ten (1938) - 3rd Signalman (uncredited)
 The Gaunt Stranger (1938) - Detective Sgt. Richards
 Many Tanks Mr. Atkins (1938) - Sgt. Maj. Cyril Hornett
 Lightning Conductor (1938) - Bus Inspector
 The Four Just Men (1939) - Benham
 At the Villa Rose (1940) - Mons. Perrichet
 Three Silent Men (1940) - Ginger Brown
 Bulldog Sees It Through (1940) - Inspector Horn
 Old Bill and Son (1941) - Shelter Delivery Man (uncredited)
 Inspector Hornleigh Goes to It (1941) - Joe (uncredited)
 'Pimpernel' Smith (1941) - Jordan
 Cottage to Let (1941) - Scotland Yard Inspector (uncredited)
 The Saint Meets the Tiger (1941) - Police constable
 The Common Touch (1941) - Pettit (uncredited)
 The Black Sheep of Whitehall (1942) - Bailiff (uncredited)
 Penn of Pennsylvania (1942) - (uncredited)
 The Missing Million (1942) - Wells
 Hard Steel (1942) - Mr. Lamport
 They Flew Alone (1942) - Policeman
 Gert and Daisy Clean Up (1942) - PC Albert Green (uncredited)
 Happidrome (1943) - Jones Jnr.
 Variety Jubilee (1943) - Commissionaire
 Up with the Lark (1943) - Policeman in Ethel and Gracie's Cell
 Time Flies (1943) - Captain Of The Guard (uncredited)
 Demobbed (1944) - Curtis
 It Happened One Sunday (1944) - Immigration Officer
 Don't Take It to Heart (1944) - Railway Porter
 Henry V (1944) - Bates - Soldier in the English Army
 He Snoops to Conquer (1945) - Policeman (uncredited)
 Johnny Frenchman (1945) - Steve Matthews
 Odd Man Out (1947) - Tom
 It Always Rains on Sunday (1947) - Yardmaster
 Daughter of Darkness (1948) - Jacob
 Good-Time Girl (1948) - Policeman At Park Gates
 My Brother's Keeper (1948) - Hodges
 Portrait from Life (1949) - Coroner's Officer (uncredited)
 Vote for Huggett (1949) - Newspaperman (uncredited)
 It's Not Cricket (1949) - Barman
 Don't Ever Leave Me (1949) - Policeman (Jack's Flat)
 Trottie True (1949) - Mr. Jupp (uncredited)
 Train of Events (1949) - (uncredited)
 Waterfront (1950) - Police Sergeant (uncredited)
 Cage of Gold (1950) - Jenkins
 The Clouded Yellow (1950) - Local Police Sgt (uncredited)
 Blackmailed (1951) - Inspector Canin
 The Lavender Hill Mob (1951) - Wallis
 The Happy Family (1952) - Granger
 Derby Day (1952) - Col. Tremaine (uncredited)
 Time Bomb (1953) - Train Driver (final film role)

Selected stage credits
 A Sleeping Clergyman by James Bridie (1933)
 The Last Straw by Reginald Denham (1937)
 Grouse in June by N.C. Hunter (1939)
 The Wind of Heaven by Emlyn Williams (1945)
 Let Tyrants Tremble! by Bernard Miles (1946)

References

External links 
 

1888 births
1952 deaths
English male stage actors
English male film actors
English male television actors
20th-century English male actors